Raymond Meyzenq (29 January 1935 – 28 November 2008) was a French professional racing cyclist. He rode in the 1956 Tour de France.

References

External links
 

1935 births
2008 deaths
French male cyclists
Sportspeople from Hautes-Alpes
Cyclists from Provence-Alpes-Côte d'Azur